is a Japanese professional shogi player ranked 7-dan.

Early life
Sasaki was born in Tsushima, Nagasaki on May 30, 1995. He learned shogi from his father when he was three years old. As a third-grade elementary school student, he won the Grades 1 to 3 division of the 3rd  in 2004. Then, as a sixth-grade elementary school student in 2007, he finished reached the semi-finals of the 32nd , but lost to fellow future professional Seiya Kondō.

The following year, Sasaki entered the Japan Shogi Association's apprentice school at the rank of 6-kyū as a student of shogi professional Kōichi Fukaura. He was promoted to the rank or 3-dan in 2013, and obtained professional status and the rank of 4-dan in April 2016 after finishing the 58th 3-dan League (October 2015March 2016) with a record of 12 wins and 6 losses. Although Sasaki actually finished league play tied with several other players who also had 12 wins, his lower league seed meant he finished in third place and thus did not earn automatic promotion to the rank of 4-dan. Third place, however, was good enough to earn him a second promotion point, and gave him the option to enter the professional ranks as a free class player.

Promotion history
Sasaki's promotion history is as follows:
 6-kyū: September 2008
 3-dan: October 2013
 4-dan: April 1, 2016
 5-dan: February 20, 2019
 6-dan: February 16, 2022
 7-dan: April 28, 2022

Awards and honors
Sasaki received the Japan Shogi Association Annual Shogi Award for "Most Games Won" for the 201819 shogi year, and the “Most Games Played” award for the 20192020 shogi year.

References

External links
ShogiHub: Professional Player Info · Sasaki, Daichi

Japanese shogi players
Living people
Professional shogi players
Professional shogi players from Nagasaki Prefecture
1995 births
Kakogawa Seiryū